Tantivy may mean:
 HMS Tantivy (P319), a British submarine
 Tantivy Towers, a three-act light opera, written by A. P. Herbert and with music by Thomas Frederick Dunhill
 Tantivy Search, an information retrieval library